The National Sports Awards is the collective name given to the six sports awards of Republic of India. It is awarded annually by the Ministry of Youth Affairs and Sports. They are presented by the President of India in the same ceremony at the Rashtrapati Bhavan usually on 29 August each year along with the national adventure award. , a total of sixty-seven individuals have been awarded the various National Sports Awards in cricket. The four awards presented in cricket are Rajiv Gandhi Khel Ratna, Arjuna Award, Dhyan Chand Award and Dronacharya Award.

First presented in the year 1961, a total of fifty-six individuals have been honoured with the Arjuna Award in cricket for their "good performance at the international level" over the period of last four years First presented in the year 1986, a total of seven coaches have been honoured with the Dronacharya Award in cricket for their "outstanding work on a consistent basis and enabling sportspersons to excel in international events" over the period of last four years, with two coaches being awarded in the lifetime contribution category. First presented in the year 1997–1998, a total of four sportspersons have been honoured with the Rajiv Gandhi Khel Ratna, the highest sporting honour of India, in cricket for their "most outstanding performance at the international level" over the period of last four years.

Recipients

, four cricketers have been awarded the highest sporting award, the Rajiv Gandhi Khel Ratna. The first recipient was Sachin Tendulkar, considered one of the greatest batsmen of all time according to the Encyclopedia Britannica, and the first cricketer to score 100 centuries in international competition. He was presented with the Arjuna Award in the year 1994 and the Rajiv Gandhi Khel Ratna award in the year 1997–1998. He is also the highest run scorer of all time in International cricket and the first sportsperson to be awarded the Bharat Ratna, India's highest civilian award in 2014.

The second recipient, MS Dhoni, is the former captain of the Indian national team in limited-overs formats from 2007 to 2016 and in Test cricket from 2008 to 2014. Under his captaincy, India won the inaugural 2007 ICC World Twenty20, the 2011 ICC Cricket World Cup and the 2013 ICC Champions Trophy. He was a wicket-keeper and one of the highest run scorers in One Day Internationals of all time. He was presented with the Rajiv Gandhi Khel Ratna award in the year 2007. In 2016, a sport biopic M.S. Dhoni: The Untold Story based on his life was released.

The third recipient, is  Virat Kohli.

Rohit Sharma , the fourth recipient , the current cricket captain in all formats, hit 264, the highest individual score in ODI format. He also became the first and only cricketer to hit 5 centuries in a single World Cup during 2019 Cricket Cricket Cup. He is also the only cricketer to hit three double centuries in an ODI.

References

External links
 Official Website

Indian sports trophies and awards
Ministry of Youth Affairs and Sports